Downtown Science is the second solo studio album by American hip hop producer Blockhead. It was released on Ninja Tune on October 18, 2005.

Critical reception

Chris Ingold of MusicOMH commented that "this is an album to stick on your iPod as you walk through Manhattan at night, even if it's a pretend Manhattan in your home town miles away." Jason Crock of Pitchfork wrote, "Downtown Science could have been a sleek limousine ride through Blockhead's version of New York, but we'll have to settle for an appropriately funky cab ride."

Track listing

Personnel
Credits adapted from the CD liner notes.

 Blockhead – production
 Damien Paris – co-production (3, 5, 7, 8, 12), guitar (1, 5, 6, 8, 11, 12), bass guitar (7, 8)
 John Rosenthal – upright bass (4)
 Bummy D and the Port Authority Three – harmonica (9), cans (9)
 Andrew Totolos – drums (9), mixing
 Baby Dayliner – mixing
 B. Smith – layout, design

References

External links
 

2005 albums
Blockhead (music producer) albums
Ninja Tune albums